The 1984 Soviet Chess Championship was the 51st edition of USSR Chess Championship. Held from 2-28 April 1984 in Lviv. The title was won by Andrei Sokolov. Semifinals took place in Volgodonsk, Irkutsk, Minsk, and Nikolayev. The First League (also qualifying to the final) was held at Tallinn.

Qualifying

Semifinals 
Semifinals took place at (the first three gaining a direct promotion to the final): Volgodonsk (Novikov, Sveshnikov, Ehlvest); Irkutsk (Lputian, Chemin, Chekhov); Minsk (Belyavsky, Vyzhmanavin, Eingom); Nikolayev (Aseev, Mikhalchishin, A.Sokolov).

First League 
The top five qualified for the final.

Boris Gulko did not play the final for an unknown reason, and was replaced by Yuri Balashov.

Final

References 

USSR Chess Championships
Chess
1984 in chess
1984 in Soviet sport